The Combat Commanders' School or CCS is the advanced air combat tactics development and training school of the Pakistan Air Force (PAF) based at PAF Base Mushaf, Sargodha, Pakistan.

CCS is a part of the PAF Airpower Centre of Excellence (PAF ACE) under the PAF's Central Air Command (CAC). Operationally, PAF ACE has the status of a Wing under the CAC, with four fighter squadrons of the CCS under its command.

CCS is geared primarily towards the mid-career advanced air combat training of PAF fighter squadron commanders, air defence controllers, and instructors and for the development of advanced air combat tactics.

History

The CCS has its origins in the PAF's Flight Leaders' School (FLS) established at PAF Base Masroor at Karachi in April 1958 under the PAF's first Pakistani Commander-in-Chief, Air Marshal Asghar Khan, with Wing Commander M.Z. Masud (later Air Commodore) as the FLS's first commanding officer. After the 1965 India-Pakistan War, the FLS underwent periodic closures due to various constraints and faded from the scene in the early 1970s.

In late 1974, the PAF decided to establish an institution that would not only revive the FLS but surpass it.

Consequently, the CCS was established on 5 May 1976 at PAF Base Sargodha with Wing Commander Hakimullah (later Air Chief Marshal) as its first commanding officer. It was inaugurated officially by Air Chief Marshal Zulfiqar Ali Khan on 15 August 1977. At its inception, the CCS was equipped with two fighter squadrons comprising Mirage III and F-6 fighters. On 16 July 1988, an F-16 squadron was added. In 1993, the F-6 squadron was re-equipped with F-7Ps. On 26 January 2015, a fourth squadron equipped with JF-17s was raised.

In 2016, CCS was made a part of the newly-formed PAF ACE under the CAC.

In 2021, the CCS F-7P Squadron was decommissioned after the retirement of all F-7Ps/FT-7Ps from PAF service. 

In February 2023, No. 23 Air Superiority (AS) Squadron 'Talons', equipped with the newer and more advanced F-7PGs/FT-7PGs, was transferred to CCS from 31 AS Wing (Western Air Command), PAF Base Samungli (Quetta) to serve as the new CCS F-7PG Squadron.

Mission

The CCS has the following mission:

 Research and development of advanced air combat tactics 
 Application of advanced air combat tactics
 Training of fighter squadron commanders, air defence controllers, and instructors on advanced air combat tactics
 Optimum and effective utilization of weapons systems
 Standardisation and evaluation of fighter squadrons
 Prescribing minimum standards for fighter squadron training and operational readiness

Training

The CCS conducts Combat Commanders' Courses (CCCs) for combat pilots and combat controllers. Previously, Fighter Weapon Instructors' Courses (FWICs) were also conducted for junior leaders. Subsequently, however, FWICs were discontinued to accommodate the more urgent need for imparting training to commanding officers, who would, in turn, impart training to junior officers.

As of December 2021, the CCS has conducted 55 CCCs.

Pilots are normally selected to undergo rigorous training at the CCS after around 9 to 12 years of service with the PAF. Once selected by Air Headquarters, they undergo three courses: a 4–5 month Combat Commanders' Course (CCC), a 3 month Weapons Course (WC), and a 4–5 week Fighter Integration Course (FIC). The courses are reputed to be very tough and not all CCS students pass. Successful graduates can go on to attain the rank of Wing Commander and command a squadron.

Dissimilar air combat training (DACT) at the CCS is renowned "throughout the world" for giving complete freedom and responsibility to participating pilots for forming and executing their mission plans. Combat missions are regularly flown at tree-top height and pilots are also responsible for their own post-flight learning. Foreign Chiefs of Air Staff visiting the base have been "most impressed" and "showed surprise at the freedom allotted to the student DACT pilots."

CCS staff pay annual visits to all PAF fighter squadrons to evaluate and enhance combat capabilities and ensure standards. In June 1990, the Squadron Combat Upgradation Programme (SCUP) was initiated and four-month-long cycles were conducted by October 1990, each involving two fighter squadrons, F-16 pilots and ground controllers. In 1992, SCUP was replaced with the regular Exercise Saffron Bandit, which is a more demanding and complicated near-realistic environment for participating fighter pilots and air defence controllers. Exercise Saffron Bandit is still supervised and its syllabus constantly improved by the CCS.

Squadrons
The CCS has four active fighter squadrons under its command:

Active squadrons

Decommissioned squadrons

Commanding officers
Group Captain Hakimullah (5 May 1976-January 1978) (later Air Chief Marshal) 
Group Captain Cecil Chaudhry (January 1978-January 1979)
Group Captain Abbas H. Mirza 
Group Captain Dilawar Hussain
Group Captain Aliuddin
Group Captain Muhammad Abbas Khattak (later Air Chief Marshal) 
Group Captain Muhammad Arshad Chaudhry
Group Captain Abdul Sattar Alvi
Group Captain Zahid Anis
Group Captain Shahid Javed
Group Captain Riffat Munir
Group Captain Abdul Razzaq
Group Captain Khalid Chaudhry 
Group Captain Abdul Hameed Qadri 
Group Captain Sabeeh Hussain
Group Captain Faaiz Amir
Group Captain Atique Rafiq 
Group Captain Raja Rizwanullah Khan 
Group Captain Sohail Aman (later Air Chief Marshal)
Group Captain Javaid Ahmed
Group Captain Muhammad Azam
Group Captain Abdul Jabbar Khan
Group Captain Syed Nomaan Ali
Group Captain Muhammad Suleman Aziz
Group Captain Zahid Mehmood
Group Captain Abdul Moeed Khan
Group Captain Nadeem Akhtar 
Group Captain Muhammad Zaeem Afzal

Published sources

 Downing, Mke, Pakistan's 'Top Gun' Base, Air Forces Monthly, April 1992
 Pakistan Air Force, The Story of the Pakistan Air Force 1988-1998: A Battle Against Odds, Islamabad: Shaheen Foundation, 2000 (pp. 289-292) 
 Pakistan Air Force, The Story of the Pakistan Air Force: A Saga of Courage and Honour, Islamabad: Shaheen Foundation, 1988 (pp. 534, 589-590)
 Warnes, Alan, The Pakistan Air Force 1998-2008: A New Dawn'', 2009, Chapter 3 (“Training for Combat”), (p. 48)

External links
 Dunya News TV Report on CCS (Urdu, 2 April 2016)

See also
Pakistan Air Force Academy, Risalpur
PAF Airpower Centre of Excellence (PAF ACE), Sargodha
PAF Air War College, Karachi
List of Pakistan Air Force squadrons

References

Pakistan Air Force
Pakistan Air Force education and training
1976 establishments in Pakistan
Military units and formations established in 1976